The 2000 First-Year Player Draft, Major League Baseball's annual amateur draft of high school and college baseball players, was held in June 2000. A total of 1,452 players were drafted.

First round selections

Compensation picks

Background
The Florida Marlins made Adrián González of Eastlake High School in Chula Vista, California the first overall selection in the 2000 First-Year Player Draft. González, who was rated as the best pure high school hitter in the draft by Baseball America, was the first high school first baseman taken first overall since the New York Yankees chose Ron Blomberg in 1967. In his senior year, González hit .645 with 13 home runs and 34 RBI.

Among the college players chosen was David Parrish, son of former major leaguer Lance Parrish, by the New York Yankees with the 28th pick. In addition, David Espinosa, a high school shortstop from Miami, Florida, became the first RBI (Reviving Baseball in Inner Cities) alumnus ever selected in the first round of the draft.

Infielder Xavier Nady, second-round pick of the San Diego Padres out of the University of California, went straight to the Major Leagues in 2000. He became the 19th player to do so since the draft started in 1965.

Other notable players

Xavier Nady, 2nd round, 49th overall by the San Diego Padres
Chris Narveson, 2nd round, 53rd overall by the St. Louis Cardinals
Brian Tallet, 2nd round, 55th overall by the Cleveland Indians
Joel Hanrahan, 2nd round, 57th overall by the Los Angeles Dodgers
Manny Delcarmen, 2nd round, 62nd overall by the Boston Red Sox
Chad Qualls, 2nd round, 67th overall by the Houston Astros
Grady Sizemore, 3rd round, 75th overall by the Montreal Expos
Michael Morse, 3rd round, 82nd overall by the Chicago White Sox
Chris Young, 3rd round, 89th overall by the Pittsburgh Pirates
Todd Wellemeyer, 4th round, 103rd overall by the Chicago Cubs
David DeJesus, 4th round, 104th overall by the Kansas City Royals
Cliff Lee, 4th round, 105th overall by the Montreal Expos
Yadier Molina, 4th round, 113th overall by the St. Louis Cardinals
Laynce Nix, 4th round, 124th overall by the Texas Rangers
Garrett Atkins, 5th round, 137th overall by the Colorado Rockies
Bobby Jenks, 5th round, 140th overall by the Anaheim Angels
Taylor Buchholz, 6th round, 175th overall by the Philadelphia Phillies
Aaron Hill, 7th round, 200th overall by the Anaheim Angels
Dontrelle Willis, 8th round, 223rd overall by the Chicago Cubs
Nick Masset, 8th round, 244th overall by the Texas Rangers
Brandon Webb, 8th round, 249th overall by the Arizona Diamondbacks
Edwin Encarnación, 9th round, 274th overall by the Texas Rangers
Clint Barmes, 10th round, 287th overall by the Colorado Rockies
Brad Hawpe, 11th round, 317th overall by the Colorado Rockies
Corey Hart, 11th round, 321st overall by the Milwaukee Brewers
Freddy Sanchez, 11th round, 332nd overall by the Boston Red Sox
Jason Kubel, 12th round, 342nd overall by the Minnesota Twins
Brian Bruney, 12th round, 369th overall by the Arizona Diamondbacks
Keoni DeRenne, 12th round, 370th overall by the Atlanta Braves
Ryan Church, 14th round, 426h overall by the Cleveland Indians
James Shields, 16th round, 466th overall by the Tampa Bay Devil Rays
Josh Willingham, 17th round, 491st overall by the Florida Marlins
Paul Maholm, 17th round, 492nd overall by the Minnesota Twins, but did not sign
Mike Napoli, 17th round, 500th overall by the Anaheim Angels
Rich Harden, 17th round, 510th overall by the Oakland Athletics
Michael Bourn, 19th round, 577th overall by the Houston Astros, but did not sign
José Bautista, 20th round, 599th overall by the Pittsburgh Pirates
Jason Bay, 22nd round, 645th overall by the Montreal Expos
Jason Hammel, 23rd round, 686th overall by the Seattle Mariners, but did not sign
Nate McLouth, 25th round, 749th overall by the Pittsburgh Pirates
Chad Cordero, 26th round, 769th overall by the San Diego Padres, but did not sign
Ian Snell, 26th round, 779th overall by the Pittsburgh Pirates
Ian Kinsler, 29th round, 879th overall by the Arizona Diamondbacks, but did not sign
Adam LaRoche, 29th round, 880th overall by the Atlanta Braves
Brian Wilson, 30th round, 906th overall by the Cleveland Indians, but did not sign
Nick Blackburn, 34th round, 1006th overall by the Tampa Bay Devil Rays, but did not sign
Russell Martin, 35th round, 1035th overall by the Montreal Expos, but did not sign
Tim Stauffer, 36th round, 1074th overall by the Baltimore Orioles, but did not sign
Scott Baker, 36th round, 1079th overall by the Pittsburgh Pirates, but did not sign
Tom Gorzelanny, 38th round, 1132nd overall by the Chicago White Sox, but did not sign
Luke Scott, 45th round, 1327th overall by the Tampa Bay Devil Rays, but did not sign
David Murphy, 50th round, 1439th overall by the Anaheim Angels, but did not sign

NFL players drafted
Mewelde Moore, 4th round, 109th overall by the San Diego Padres
Michael Vick, 30th round, 887th overall by the Colorado Rockies, but did not sign
Ronnie Brown, 42nd round, 1253rd overall by the Seattle Mariners, but did not sign
Freddie Mitchell, 50th round, 1441st overall by the Chicago White Sox, but did not sign
Brooks Bollinger, 50th round, 1443rd overall by the Los Angeles Dodgers, but did not sign

Notes

References

External links
Complete draft list from The Baseball Cube database
MLB.com's section on the draft.

Major League Baseball draft
Draft
Major League Baseball draft